Juanjo Mena (also known as Juan José Mena; born 21 September 1965, Vitoria-Gasteiz, Basque Country, Spain) is a Spanish conductor.

Biography
Mena began his music studies at the Vitoria-Gasteiz Conservatory.  He later attended the Madrid Royal Conservatory, where his teachers included Carmelo Bernaola (composition and orchestration) and Enrique García Asensio (conducting).  He also studied conducting with Sergiu Celibidache in Munich on a Guridi-Bernaola scholarship.  In 1997, the Basque Government selected Mena to form the Youth Orchestra of Euskal Herria.  He subsequently became associate conductor of the Euskadi Symphony Orchestra.

From 1999 to 2008, Mena was artistic director and principal conductor of the Bilbao Symphony Orchestra.  With the Bilbao orchestra, he conducted commercial recordings for Naxos Records of music by Jesús Guridi and Andrés Isasi.  His guest-conducting debut in North America was with the Baltimore Symphony Orchestra in 2004.  Mena served as principal guest conductor of the Teatro Carlo Felice, Genoa from 2007 to 2010.  He was principal guest conductor of the Bergen Philharmonic Orchestra from 2007 to 2013.

In July 2010, the BBC Philharmonic announced the appointment of Mena as its ninth chief conductor, effective with the 2011–2012 season, with an initial contract of three years, leading twelve concerts per year. Mena directed the BBC Philharmonic in four concerts prior to his appointment. In 2013, Mena extended his contract with the BBC Philharmonic for an additional 3 years.  He concluded his tenure as chief conductor of the BBC Philharmonic in the summer of 2018. Mena and the BBC Philharmonic have commercially recorded music of Gabriel Pierné, Manuel de Falla, and of Xavier Montsalvatge for the Chandos label.

In 2016, the Orquesta Nacional de España named Mena its new 'Director Asociado' (principal guest conductor). In October 2016, the Cincinnati May Festival announced the appointment of Mena as its new principal conductor, effective with the 2017–2018 season, with an initial contract of 3 years. His contract was extended, ending with the 2023 May Festival. 

Mena and his wife Noemi have two children.  In January 2017, Mena was awarded the Medalla de Oro de Álava.

References

External links
 Official Juanjo Mena homepage, English-language link
 IMG Artists profile of Juanjo Mena
 Cincinnati May Festival profile of Juanjo Mena
 Richard Wigley, BBC Radio 3 Blog page on appointment of Mena as chief conductor
 ClassicsToday.com review of Naxos CD 8.557631
 ClassicsToday.com review of Naxos CD 8.557110
 ClassicsToday.com review of Naxos CD 8.557584

Spanish conductors (music)
Male conductors (music)
Basque classical musicians
People from Vitoria-Gasteiz
Spanish expatriates in the United Kingdom
1965 births
Living people
21st-century conductors (music)
21st-century male musicians
21st-century Spanish musicians
20th-century conductors (music)
20th-century Spanish male musicians
20th-century Spanish musicians